Butter chicken,   traditionally known as  murgh makhani , is an Indian dish originating in New Delhi. It is a type of curry made from chicken with a spiced tomato and butter (makhan) sauce. Its sauce is known for its rich texture. It is similar to chicken tikka masala, which uses a tomato paste.

History
The curry was developed in New Delhi in the 1950s after the Partition of India by Kundan Lal Jaggi and Kundan Lal Gujral, who were both Punjabi Hindu migrants from Peshawar, as well as the founders of the Moti Mahal restaurant in the Daryaganj neighbourhood of Old Delhi. The curry was made "by chance" by mixing leftover tandoori chicken in a tomato gravy, rich in butter (makhan). In 1974, a recipe was published for "Murgh makhanii (Tandoori chicken cooked in butter and tomato sauce)". In 1975, the English phrase "butter chicken" curry first appeared in print, as a specialty of the house at Gaylord Indian restaurant in Manhattan. In Toronto and the Caribbean, it can be found as a filling in pizza, poutine, wraps, roti, or rolls, while in Australia, and New Zealand, it is also eaten as a pie filling. The curry is common in India, Pakistan, and many other countries where a South Asian diaspora is present.

Preparation
Chicken is marinated for several hours in a mixture of lemon juice, dahi (yogurt), Kashmiri red chili, salt, garam masala, ginger paste, and garlic paste.

The marinated chicken is cooked in a tandoor (traditional clay oven), but may be grilled, oven-roasted, or pan-fried. It is served in a mild curry sauce that includes butter. The sauce is a tomato, garlic, and ginger-based sauce that is simmered until smooth and much of the water has evaporated. There are many variations on the composition and spicing of the sauce, which is sieved so that it is velvety smooth. Spices may include cardamom, cumin, cloves, cinnamon, coriander, pepper, garam masala, and fenugreek (Punjabi/Hindi: kasuri methi). Cashew paste may be used as a thickener and it is finally garnished with coriander.

See also

 Chicken tikka masala
 Moti Mahal Delux
 Dal makhani
 Paneer makhani
 List of chicken dishes

References

Bibliography
 Curry Club Tandoori and Tikka Dishes, Piatkus, London —  (1993)
Curry Club 100 Favourite Tandoori Recipes, Piatkus, London —   &  (1995)
 India: Food & Cooking, New Holland, London —  (2007)

South Asian curries
Indian cuisine
Indian chicken dishes
Indian cuisine outside India
Pakistani chicken dishes
Tomato dishes
Foods featuring butter
Indo-Caribbean curries
Punjabi cuisine